Shakespeare Squared is a content development company in the United States. The company creates print and digital products for educational and trade book publishers. Their work includes standards-based writing and editing for preK-12 textbooks and workbooks, specialized assessment and test preparation materials, translations, and online content development. 

The company's office was in Northbrook, IL. In addition to a small in-house staff, the company utilizes a network of more than 2000 freelance editors, writers, and other contributors. The business is now closed.

History
Shakespeare Squared was co-founded in 2003 by Kim and Jay Kleeman. High school teachers themselves, the Kleemans decided to join their expertise in language and literature and math and science to offer comprehensive development services across all disciplines and media. While Jay stayed in the classroom, Kim continues to serve as the company's President and CEO.

Divisions
While Shakespeare Squared has its roots in the educational publishing industry, the company expanded its services in 2008 with the launch of its digital media division, S2EO. S2EO provides content for a wide variety of industries in the business world. Their services include article writing, marketing materials, e-newsletters, social media, white papers, and web content and development.

Products
Shakespeare Squared has created projects for CB Richard Ellis, Honor Flight Chicago, Houghton Mifflin, Hudson Highland Group, McGraw-Hill, McDougal Littell, Pearson Education, and Riverside Publishing, among others. Their products include children's books, teacher guides, student workbooks, and online universities. Samples of their work are:
 Articles–HowStuffWorks
 Teacher guide and student activity pages–Zondervan
 Lesson plans and activities–Habitat for Humanity International
 Cosmeo Explorations–Discovery Communications
 I Can Read!–HarperCollins
 George's Secret Key to the Universe–Simon & Schuster

Recognition and awards
 Alfred P. Sloan Award for Business Excellence in Workplace Flexibility (2010)—Honorable Mention
 Alfred P. Sloan Award for Business Excellence in Workplace Flexibility (2009)
 Chicago Innovation Award Nominee (2008)
 Alfred P. Sloan Award for Business Excellence in Workplace Flexibility (2008)
 30 Best Places to Work in Illinois (2008)
 Inc. 500 Fastest Growing Private Companies in America (2007)—No. 5 Ranking in Education, No. 329 Ranking Overall
 Working Mother Best 25 Small Companies (2007)
 Business Ledger's Entrepreneurial Excellence Awards (2007)—Nominee in the “Today’s Young Entrepreneur” category

Media spotlights
 Crain's 40 Under 40–Kim Kleeman (2008)
 Fox News Chicago, “Some Workplaces Making Themselves More Baby-Friendly” (October 31, 2008)
 MSNBC, “Your Business”
 Inc. Magazine, “The Way I Work: Kim Kleeman” (2007)

See also
 List of Illinois companies

References

External links 
 
 

Educational publishing companies
Publishing companies established in 2003